Red River High School (RRHS) is a public high school located in Grand Forks, North Dakota, United States. The school was originally built in 1967 for grades 10-12, and was remodeled in 1995 to accommodate grades 9- 12. It serves approximately 1,137 students and is one of two high schools in the Grand Forks Public Schools system. The athletic teams are known as the Roughriders.

The Red River in the school's name refers to the Red River of the North which flows on the east side of the city. The name Roughriders is a reference to former President Theodore Roosevelt, who spent a portion of his life in what would become western North Dakota.

Red River High School is home to the Summer Performing Arts Company, a summer educational theatre program for grades K-12.

Academics
RRHS offers classes in a range of academic fields. Dual credit and Advanced Placement classes are available in several areas of study.

Athletics
The athletic teams at RRHS are known as the Roughriders.

Sports offered
Cross-country (boys' and girls')
Baseball (boys')
Basketball (boys' and girls')
Football (boys')
Gymnastics (girls')*
Hockey (boys')
Hockey (girls')*
Track and field (boys' and girls')
Soccer (boys' and girls')
Swimming (boys' and girls')*
Softball (girls')
Golf (boys' and girls')
Tennis (boys' and girls')
Volleyball (girls')
Wrestling (co-ed)
*RRHS and Central High School have combined teams in several sporting areas, due to low participation numbers, known as the "Knightriders".

State championships
State Class 'A' boys' basketball: 1969, 2012

State Class 'A' girls' basketball: 1988

State boys' hockey: 1974, 1977*, 1987, 1988, 1989, 1990, 1996, 1997, 1998, 2000, 2001, 2005, 2007, 2009, 2011, 2013, 2016, 2020, 2022

State boys' soccer: 2002, 2005

State girls' soccer: 2004

State Class 'A' boys' track and field: 1983, 1992

State Class 'A' girls' track and field: 1998, 2000

State Class 'A' boys' cross country: 1973, 1975

State Class 'A' girls' cross country: 1973, 1975

State Class 'A' volleyball: 1992, 1993, 1998, 1999, 2002, 2003, 2009, 2011

State Class 'A' boys' tennis: 1972*, 1973, 1983, 1986, 1989, 1991, 1992, 1994, 1996, 1998, 1999, 2000, 2001, 2002, 2003, 2004, 2005, 2006, 2007, 2008, 2009, 2010, 2011, 2012, 2013, 2014, 2016

State Class 'A' girls' tennis: 1984, 1992, 1993, 1994, 1995, 1996, 1998, 2002, 2003, 2004, 2005, 2006, 2007, 2008, 2009, 2010, 2011, 2012, 2013, 2014, 2015, 2017
State Class 'A' boys' golf: 1975, 1977, 1981, 1982, 1986, 1990, 1994, 1995, 1996, 2017, 2018, 2019
State Class 'A' girls' golf: 1979, 1988, 1990, 1997, 2017
State Class 'A' gymnastics: 2004, 2005, 2006
*Denotes co-championship

Notable alumni
Donald Barcome Jr. (b. 1958), former American Olympic curler
Tom Brosseau (b. 1976), American musical storyteller and guitarist
Jon Godfread (b. 1981/1982), American politician and the World's Tallest Politician
Joel Harlow (b. 1968), American make-up artist
Arshad Hasan (b. 1980), former executive director of ProgressNow and Democracy for America
Virgil Hill (b. 1964), former American professional boxer
Nicole Linkletter (b. 1985), American fashion model and the winner of Cycle 5 of America's Next Top Model''
Edward O'Keefe, current CEO of the Theodore Roosevelt Presidential Library Foundation
Grant Potulny (b. 1980), former American professional ice hockey player
Jon Lizotte (b. 1994), American professional ice hockey player
Ryan Potulny (b. 1984), former American professional ice hockey player
Andy Schneider (b. 1981), former American professional ice hockey player

References

External links

Red River High School website
Grand Forks School District

Public high schools in North Dakota
Buildings and structures in Grand Forks, North Dakota
North Dakota High School Activities Association (Class A)
North Dakota High School Activities Association (Class AAA Football)
Schools in Grand Forks County, North Dakota
Educational institutions established in 1967
1967 establishments in North Dakota